Indika Gunawardena (8 February 1943 –  14 September  2015) was a Sri Lankan politician.

Indika Gunawardena was born on 8 February 1943, the son of Philip Gunawardena and Kusumasiri née Amarasinghe. His brothers included Prasanna Gunawardena former mayor of Colombo, Lakmali Gunawardena state award winner of literature, Dinesh Gunawardena cabinet minister, and Gitanjana Gunawardena former minister. Gunawardena was educated at the Royal College, Colombo.

He was first elected to parliament at the 1994 Sri Lankan parliamentary elections representing the Sri Lanka Freedom Party in the Colombo electorate. He was appointed as the Minister of Fisheries and Aquatic Research in 1994, as part of the Wijetunga cabinet, the Minister of Higher Education and Information Technology Development in October 2000, and the Minister of Posts and Telecommunication in September 2001, as part of the Kumaratunga cabinet.

See also
List of political families in Sri Lanka

References & External links
 The Gunawardena Ancestry
Food for thought from the North 
You’re hiding behind sari pota, angry Srimani tells Ashraff

1943 births
2015 deaths
Sri Lankan Buddhists
Alumni of Royal College, Colombo
Sri Lankan communists
Provincial councillors of Sri Lanka
Members of the 10th Parliament of Sri Lanka
Members of the 11th Parliament of Sri Lanka
Posts ministers of Sri Lanka
Telecommunication ministers of Sri Lanka
Fisheries ministers of Sri Lanka
Higher education ministers of Sri Lanka
Sinhalese politicians